Gary Richard Lillibridge (born May 2, 1956) is an American Episcopal bishop. He was the ninth bishop of the Episcopal Diocese of West Texas.

Early life and education
Lillibridge was born on May 2, 1956, in San Antonio, Texas, United States. He was raised as an Episcopalian. He studied education at Southwest Texas State University, graduating with a Bachelor of Science (BSc) degree in 1978. He trained for ordination at the Virginia Theological Seminary, and graduated in 1982 with a Master of Divinity (M.Div.) degree.

Ordained ministry
Lillibridge was ordained in the Episcopal Church as a deacon in June 1982 and as a priest in January 1983.

In October 2003, Lillibridge was elected as the ninth Bishop of West Texas. On February 21, 2004, he was consecrated a bishop by Frank Griswold, the then Presiding Bishop of the Episcopal Church. He then served as coadjutor bishop to James E. Folts, the Bishop of the Episcopal Diocese of West Texas. He took up the appointment of diocesan bishop in 2006, upon the retirement of Bishop Folts.

Lillibridge retired from full-time ministry in 2017.

Views
Lillibridge has been described as a traditionalist and a conservative. However, in April 2015, he granted three parishes in his diocese permission to "conduct same-sex blessings".

Personal life
In 1985, Lillibridge married Catherine DeForrest. Together they have three children: Sarah, Amy, and Thomas.

References

1956 births
Living people
21st-century Anglican bishops in the United States
People from San Angelo, Texas
Texas State University alumni
Virginia Theological Seminary alumni
Episcopal bishops of West Texas